The women's high jump event at the 1992 World Junior Championships in Athletics was held in Seoul, Korea, at Olympic Stadium on 17 and 19 September.

Medalists

Results

Final
19 September

Qualifications
17 Sep

Group A

Group B

Participation
According to an unofficial count, 24 athletes from 18 countries participated in the event.

References

High jump
High jump at the World Athletics U20 Championships